Sir Pierce Butler, 4th Baronet of Cloughgrenan (a townland near Carlow), PC (Ire) (1670 – 17 April 1732) was an Irish politician and baronet.

He was the eldest son of Sir Thomas Butler, 3rd Baronet and his wife Jane Boyle, daughter of the Right Reverend Richard Boyle, Bishop of Leighlin and Ferns. In 1691, Butler was educated at Trinity College, Dublin and  Lincoln's Inn.  In 1704, he succeeded his father as baronet. Butler represented Carlow County in the Irish House of Commons from 1703 to 1715. In 1712, he was invested to the Privy Council of Ireland.

Marriage
In December 1697, he married Anne Galliard, daughter of Joshua Galliard. Butler died without male issue and thus the baronetcy went to his nephew Richard.

See also
 Butler dynasty

References

1670 births
1732 deaths
Pierce
Politicians from County Carlow
Irish MPs 1703–1713
Irish MPs 1713–1714
Members of Lincoln's Inn
17th-century Irish people
Baronets in the Baronetage of Ireland
Members of the Parliament of Ireland (pre-1801) for County Carlow constituencies
Members of the Privy Council of Ireland
Butler baronets, of Cloughgrenan
Alumni of Trinity College Dublin